= The Arms Peddler =

Japanese manga series

- First volume cover

牙の旅商人 (Kiba no Tabishōnin)
- Genre: Dark fantasy
- Manga
- Written by: Kyoichi Nanatsuki
- Illustrated by: Night Owl
- Published by: Square Enix
- Imprint: YG Comics
- Magazine: Young Gangan
- Original run: May 7, 2010 – present
- Volumes: 7
- icon

The Arms Peddler (Japanese: 牙の旅商人, Hepburn: Kiba no Tabishōnin) is a Japanese manga series written by Kyoichi Nanatsuki and illustrated by Night Owl. It has been serialized in Square Enix's seinen manga magazine Young Gangan since May 2010.

== Plot ==
Sona Yuki, a young settler traveling with his family to a new land, witnesses their brutal massacre at the hands of the Hydra bandits. Branded with a searing iron and left to perish in the desert, he is rescued by Garami, a ruthless weapons merchant. She saves his life under the harsh law of the wasteland—claiming ownership of him until he repays his debt of 100 gold coins. Determined to avenge his family, Sona trades his mother's last memento for a sword from Garami and joins her travels. As he hones his skills and gathers the means for his vengeance, their uneasy partnership becomes a journey of survival, bloodshed, and shifting loyalties in a merciless world.

== Publication ==
Written by Kyoichi Nanatsuki and illustrated by Night Owl, The Arms Peddler started in Square Enix's seinen manga magazine Young Gangan on May 7, 2010. The series went on hiatus in 2012 and resumed publication in 2014. Its most recent chapter was published in February 2017. Square Enix has collected its chapters into individual tankōbon volumes. The first volume was released on November 25, 2010. As of July 25, 2015, seven volumes have been released.

=== Volumes ===
No.	Release date	ISBN
1	November 25, 2010	978-4-7575-3042-3
2	March 25, 2011	978-4-7575-3179-6
3	August 25, 2011	978-4-7575-3348-6
4	January 25, 2012	978-4-7575-3491-9
5	June 25, 2012	978-4-7575-3639-5
6	November 24, 2012	978-4-7575-3798-9
7	July 25, 2015	978-4-7575-4649-3
